George Ali (born George Bolingbroke; c.1866−April 26, 1947) was an actor who specialized in the "skin game", playing animals in stage and cinema productions, known as an animal impersonator. He performed in a number of stage plays, working as lions, tigers, and bears, but it was as the canine nursemaid Nana and the Crocodile in the 1924 film adaptation of Peter Pan for which he seems best remembered.  Barrie had written the part expecting it to be played by a boy, but adults were cast for the technically demanding role. Ali played the character at the age of 58.

George Ali's performance as Nana was highly acclaimed. Of particular note is the puppeteering of Nana’s mouth and eyes. Ali manipulates the head features from within, picking up towels and carrying spoons, whilst walking on all fours.

He was a very skilled puppeteer and gymnast.  It’s unknown if Ali also had a hand in creating his special costumes. In the early days of film and television, it was not uncommon for makeup artists and stuntmen to create and perform their own special effects characters. It is said that he also played the part of the Crocodile as well.

Ali died April 26, 1947, in Freeport, Long Island, NY.

Filmography

Peter Pan (as Nana/Crocodile)

Theatre productions
Parade (as The Jackass)
Chee-Chee (as San Toy)
White Wings (as Joseph)
Buster Brown (as Tige)
The Jersey Lily (as Pretty Polly)
Dick Whittington and His Cat (as Mouser the Cat)
George W. Lederer's Mid-Summer Night Fancies (as Mr. Black Bear)
The Wild Rose (as Baby)
Hoity Toity (as Baron Barbon)
Depleurisy (as Antoine)
A Man From Mars (as A Trolley Victim)
Fiddle-dee-dee (as Leo)
Quo Vass Iss? (as Sparrus Copus)
Arizona (as Ham Song)
Exhibit II (as Tipit)
Whirl-i-gig (as Performer)
Tom, Tom, the Piper's Son (as Performer)

References

1866 births
1947 deaths
American puppeteers
American male stage actors